The Fulbright Tower is a 52-story office skyscraper originally known as 3 Houston Center. A part of the downtown Houston Center complex, Texas, United States, the tower has  of Class A office space. The bottom seven levels were designed for four trading floors for commodities like electricity and natural gas. The building at one point was owned by ChevronTexaco. As of 2005, Crescent owns the tower in a joint venture with the affiliates of GE Asset Management and J.P. Morgan Asset Management. Norton Rose Fulbright has its Houston office located in the Fulbright Tower, in Suite 5100.

History
Construction on the tower was scheduled to begin in November 1980. The building was built in 1982. The tower property was developed in 1985. Norton Rose Fulbright became a tenant during that year. The original name of the structure was the Gulf Tower. Chevron became the building's main tenant, and its name became the Chevron Tower. Norton Rose Fulbright renegotiated and extended its lease in 2003 and retained the possibility of naming rights; as of 2005, the firm occupies  of space. On February 24, 2005, Crescent completed the joint venture agreement involving the Fulbright Tower; a pension fund investor advised by JPMorgan Asset Management bought a 60% ownership interest in the building and an affiliate of GE Asset Management bought a 16.15% ownership interest. In 2004, ChevronTexaco sold the building to Crescent. During that year the tower was 49% occupied. By March 2005, ChevronTexaco planned to move its operations out of the tower after buying 1500 Louisiana Street in Downtown Houston. Norton Rose Fulbright used their naming rights, and in 2005 the building gained the name Fulbright Tower. In 2005, the Fulbright Tower was 57% occupied. In 2006, Chevron Corporation still occupied three floors at the Fulbright Tower. In 2009 Conway MacKenzie leased  at the Fulbright Tower. Brookfield Properties, which acquired the Houston Center in 2017, began renovating the campus in 2019 alongside architectural firm Gensler. The first phase of the project was completed in 2021 and, as of March 2022, the final phase was underway.

Tenants
Norton Rose Fulbright
Key Energy Services
Office of the Comptroller of the Currency

See also

List of tallest buildings in the United States

References

Skyscraper office buildings in Houston
1982 establishments in Texas
Office buildings completed in 1982
Leadership in Energy and Environmental Design gold certified buildings